Wicked Sensation is the debut album by American rock band Lynch Mob. It was George Lynch's first release since leaving Dokken. Singer Oni Logan provided vocals, contributed to the lyrics and composition and also played harmonica. Also joining George was former Dokken drummer Mick Brown. The album had two successful singles, with "River of Love" climbing to the No. 19 spot on Billboard's Mainstream Rock chart and "Wicked Sensation" reaching No. 31.

Track listing

Personnel
Oni Logan – vocals
 George Lynch – guitar
 Anthony Esposito – bass guitar
 Mick Brown – drums
Max Norman – producer, engineering, mixing
Neil Kernon – vocal engineering
David Thoener – mixing on tracks (2, 8, 10)
Bob Ludwig – mastering

See also
1990 in music
George Lynch

References

Lynch Mob (band) albums
1990 debut albums
Albums produced by Max Norman
Elektra Records albums